DXND (747 AM) Radyo Bida is a radio station owned and operated by Notre Dame Broadcasting Corporation. It serves as the flagship station of Radyo Bida. The station's studio and transmitter are located at DXND Bldg., Maharlika Highway, Kidapawan.

References

Radio stations established in 1964
Radio stations in Cotabato